Nigerian Australians are Australian citizens and residents of Nigerian origin or descent. The Nigerian-born form one of the fastest-growing migrant groups in Australia.

Background
The Nigerian population in Australia has been increasing rapidly. The 2011 Census noted there are 4,519 Nigerian-born people in Australia. The population doubled since the previous census in 2006. The vast majority are skilled and educated, with 82.4% of the Nigerian-born aged 15 years and over possessing higher non-school qualifications, compared to 55.9% of the Australian population.

An NOIPolls survey found that 100% of Nigerians surveyed with relatives or friends living in Australia perceive Nigerians as having better living conditions in foreign countries. The only other continent with a similar response (of 100%) from Nigerians was South America.

Students
Students have become a rapidly growing source of Nigerian migrants to Australia. Nigeria is predicted to become one of the top 10 sources of international students for Australian universities. Australia’s streamlined visa processing for international students and its post-study work rights scheme have been given some credit for this. Many Nigerians come as engineering students planning to work in their country’s oil industry. Thus universities respected in engineering such as the University of NSW have seen massive growth in their Nigerian student numbers.

In 2015 it was noted that Nigerians are one of the newer student populations experiencing huge growth in Australia, comparable to student populations from Pakistan, India and Bangladesh.

Population distribution
One third of Nigerians in Australia live in Sydney, and one quarter reside in Melbourne. Half of Australia’s Igbo-speakers live in Sydney. There are many thousands of speakers of Nigerian languages, particularly Igbo, and Yoruba

Nigerian cuisine can be found in restaurants in the more diverse Australian cities such as Sydney and Melbourne.

Notable Nigerian Australians
 Francis Awaritefe - soccer player and TV commentator
 Liz Cambage - WNBA basketball player for the Las Vegas Aces (Nigerian father, but never lived in the country; born in London)
 Bernie Ibini-Isei - soccer player for Club Brugge
 Jamal Idris - rugby league player for Penrith Panthers
 Daine Laurie - rugby league player for Wests Tigers and Penrith Panthers
 Safuratu Bakare - the curator of the Perth African Fashion Show, reputed for her amazing designs using fashion to project Africa on the world stage. Her works have been featured on the ABC Television. 
 Keiynan Lonsdale - actor
 Jayden Okunbor - rugby league player for the Canterbury-Bankstown Bulldogs 
 Timomatic - singer
 Joel Wilkinson - Australian rules footballer for Gold Coast Football Club
 Eziyoda Magbegor - Basketball player
 Jason Saab - rugby league player for the Manly-Warringah Sea Eagles

See also

 African Australians
 Nigerian diaspora
Nigerian Americans
Nigerian British

References

Ethnic groups in Australia
Australia
African Australian